Louise Lenormand (14 June 1901 – 3 December 1995) was a French diver. She competed in the women's 3 metre springboard event at the 1924 Summer Olympics.

References

External links
 

1901 births
1995 deaths
French female divers
Olympic divers of France
Divers at the 1924 Summer Olympics
Place of birth missing
20th-century French women